Romy Schneider (born Rosemarie Magdalena Albach; 23 September 1938 – 29 May 1982) was a German-French actress. She began her career in the German  genre in the early 1950s when she was 15. From 1955 to 1957, she played the central character of Empress Elisabeth of Austria in the Austrian Sissi trilogy, and later reprised the role in a more mature version in Luchino Visconti's Ludwig (1973). Schneider moved to France, where she made successful and critically acclaimed films with some of the most notable film directors of that era.

Early life 
Schneider was born Rosemarie Magdalena Albach in Vienna, six months after the Anschluss of Austria into the German Reich, to actors Magda Schneider and Wolf Albach-Retty. Her paternal grandmother, Rosa Albach-Retty, was also an actress. Schneider's mother was German while her father was Austrian.

Four weeks after Romy's birth, the parents brought her to Schönau am Königssee in Germany where she and later her brother Wolf-Dieter (born 1941) grew up with their grandparents Franz Xaver and Maria Schneider on the country estate . In her first year, Romy was cared for by a governess. Her parents were very rarely present due to their acting engagements. In 1943, they separated and were divorced in 1945.

Already during her schooldays, she discovered her passion for acting which is why she was often on stage at theatrical performances at the residential school. In her diary entry of 10 June 1952, she wrote: "If it were up to me, I would immediately become an actress. ... Every time I see a nice movie, my first thoughts are about the idea: I definitely have to become an actress. Yes! I have to!" On 12 July 1953, she left the residential school Goldenstein with the degree of Mittlere Reife. After the summer holidays, she moved to Cologne to join her mother who lived there with the restaurateur and entrepreneur .

After her parents' divorce in 1945, Magda took charge of Romy and her brother Wolf-Dieter, eventually supervising the young girl's career, often appearing alongside her daughter. Her career was also overseen by her stepfather Blatzheim who, Schneider indicated, had an unhealthy interest in her.

Early career

Romy Schneider's first film, made when she was 15, was When the White Lilacs Bloom Again (1953), credited as Romy Schneider-Albach. In 1954, Schneider, for the first time, portrayed a royal, playing a young Queen Victoria in the Austrian film Mädchenjahre einer Königin (known in the U.S. as The Story of Vickie and in Britain as Victoria in Dover).

Schneider's breakthrough came with her portrayal of Empress Elisabeth of Austria in the romantic biopic Sissi (1955) and its two sequels, Sissi – The Young Empress (1956) and Sissi – Fateful Years of an Empress (1957), all with Karlheinz Böhm, who became a close friend. Less stereotypical films during this busy period include The Girl and the Legend (1957), working with a young Horst Buchholz, and Monpti (1957), directed by Helmut Käutner, again with Buchholz.

Schneider soon starred in Christine (1958), a remake of Max Ophüls's 1933 film Liebelei (in which her mother Magda Schneider had played the same role). It was during the filming of Christine that Schneider fell in love with French actor Alain Delon who co-starred in the movie. She left Germany to join him in Paris, and they announced their engagement in 1959.

Schneider decided to live and to work in France, slowly gaining the interest of film directors such as Orson Welles for The Trial (1962), based on Franz Kafka's The Trial. She was also introduced to Luchino Visconti. Under Visconti's direction, she gave performances in the Théâtre Moderne as Annabella (and Delon as Giovanni) in John Ford's stage play 'Tis Pity She's a Whore (1961), and in the film Boccaccio '70 (segment: "The Job"). In 1962, Schneider played Anna in Sacha Pitoëff's production of Chekhov's play The Seagull, also at the Théâtre Moderne.

A brief stint in Hollywood included a starring role in Good Neighbor Sam (1964), a comedy with Jack Lemmon, and What's New Pussycat? (1965), in which Schneider co-starred with Peter O'Toole, Peter Sellers, and Woody Allen.

Schneider and Delon decided to separate in December 1963, although they remained close life-long friends. They continued to work together in such films as La Piscine (The Swimming Pool, 1968) and The Assassination of Trotsky (1972).

Later career

Schneider continued to work in France during the 1970s, most notably with director Claude Sautet on five films. Their first collaboration, The Things of Life (Les choses de la vie, 1970) featuring Michel Piccoli, made Schneider an icon in France. The three collaborated again for the noir thriller Max et les ferrailleurs (Max and the Junkmen, 1971), and she appeared with Yves Montand in Sautet's César et Rosalie (1972).

Paris Match wrote 1971: "Forty years after Greta and Marlene, fifteen years after Marilyn, the screen again has a great star."

Schneider portrayed a more mature and realistic Elisabeth of Austria in Ludwig (1973), Visconti's film about the life of King Ludwig II of Bavaria. "Sissi sticks to me just like oatmeal", Schneider once said.

Other successes from this period included Le Train (1973), Claude Chabrol's thriller Innocents with Dirty Hands (Les innocents aux mains sales, 1975) with Rod Steiger, and Le vieux fusil (1975). The gritty That Most Important Thing: Love (L'important c'est d'aimer, 1974) garnered her first César Award (France's equivalent of the Oscar), a feat she repeated five years later, in her last collaboration with Sautet, for A Simple Story (Une histoire simple, 1978).

On 30 October 1974, Schneider created one of the most memorable moments on German television. She was the second guest on Dietmar Schönherr's talk show  (The Later the Evening) when she, after a rather terse interview, remarked passionately to the last guest, bank robber and author Burkhard Driest: "Sie gefallen mir. Sie gefallen mir sehr." (I like you. I like you a lot.)

She also acted in The Infernal Trio (1974) with Michel Piccoli, and in Garde à vue (1981) with Michel Serrault and Lino Ventura. An unpleasant incident occurred during this period with leading German film director Rainer Werner Fassbinder, who wanted to cast her as the lead in his film The Marriage of Maria Braun (1979). Negotiations broke down when he called Schneider a "dumb cow", to which she responded by declaring she would never work with such a "beast". Fassbinder cast Hanna Schygulla instead, reviving his professional association with an actress to whom he had also been offensive.

Schneider starred in Bertrand Tavernier's Death Watch (La mort en direct, 1980), playing a dying woman whose last days are watched on national television via a camera implanted in the brain of a journalist (Harvey Keitel). It is based on David G. Compton's novel. Schneider's last film was La Passante du Sans-Souci (The Passerby, 1982).

Personal life
Following the end of her relationship with Delon, Schneider married German director and actor Harry Meyen in July 1966; they later divorced. The couple had a son, David Christopher (1966–1981). In July 1981, David died at the age of 14 after attempting to climb the spiked fence at his stepfather's parents' home and puncturing his femoral artery in the process. She had love affairs with Oswalt Kolle (1964) and actor Bruno Ganz (early 1970s). She had a brief affair with Jean-Louis Trintignant while filming The Train (1973). She also had in 1974 a brief affair with Jacques Dutronc while filming That Most Important Thing: Love.

Schneider appeared as one of 28 women under the banner "We've had abortions!" on the cover page of the West German magazine Stern on 6 June 1971. In that issue, 374 women publicly stated that they had had pregnancies terminated which at that time was illegal.

In 1975, Schneider married , her private secretary; they divorced in 1981. Their daughter, Sarah, is an actress. Her last romantic partner was film producer  (born 1949).

In her 2018 biography Romy Schneider intime, Alice Schwarzer revealed that Schneider confided to her that she had sexual relationships with women and was deeply in love with her close friend Simone Signoret.

Death
 Schneider began drinking alcohol excessively after her son's death. However, Schneider's friend and sister of Laurent Pétin, Claude Pétin, said that she no longer drank at the time of her death and that she is convinced it was a natural death.

Schneider was found dead in her Paris apartment on 29 May 1982. The examining magistrate  declared that she died from cardiac arrest. Claude Pétin said that Schneider's cardiac arrest was due to a weakened heart caused by a kidney operation she had months before.

Her tombstone at Boissy-sans-Avoir, Yvelines, bears her birth name, Rosemarie Albach. Funeral guests were Jean-Claude Brialy, Michel Piccoli, Jean-Loup Dabadie, Jean Rochefort, . Shortly afterwards, Alain Delon arranged for her son David to be buried in the same grave.

Enduring popularity
The French journalist Eugène Moineau initiated in 1984 the Prix Romy Schneider. It is one of the most prestigious awards for upcoming actresses in the French film industry, and is given by a jury each year in Paris in conjunction with the Prix Patrick Dewaere (formerly the Prix Jean Gabin). In 1990, the Austrian newspaper Kurier created the Romy TV Award in honour of Schneider. In 2003, she was voted 78th on the list of the greatest Germans in the German TV program Unsere Besten (the German version of 100 Greatest Britons)—the second-highest ranked actress (Marlene Dietrich was 50th) on that list. Until 2002, the Austrian Federal Railways InterCity service IC 535 from Wien Südbahnhof to Graz was named "Romy Schneider".

A movie about Schneider's life, titled Eine Frau wie Romy/Une femme comme Romy (A Woman Like Romy), was planned by Warner Bros. for 2009; Schneider's role was going to be played by Yvonne Catterfeld. The project was cancelled in July 2009. A musical about Schneider, Romy – Die Welt aus Gold (Romy – The Golden World) was premiered in 2009 at the Theater Heilbronn. In November 2009, the ARD broadcast the feature film  with Jessica Schwarz in the title role. The film 3 Days in Quiberon (2018) by Emily Atef describes a 1981 episode in Schneider's life in the French town of Quiberon.

On 23 September 2020, Google celebrated her 82nd birthday with a Google Doodle in Germany, France, Austria, Iceland and Ukraine.

The culture broadcaster ARTE dedicated a documentary to Romy Schneider and Alain Delon: Romy and Alain – The Eternal Betrothed, 2022.

Filmography

Awards 

Bambi: 1957 nominated for Sissi
Bravo Otto
1957: Bronze
1958: Gold
1959: Silver
1971: Silver
1972: Bronze
1977: Bronze
: 1963 as Best Foreign Actress for The Trial
Golden Globe Award for Best Actress – Motion Picture Drama: 1963 nominated for The Cardinal
César Award for Best Actress
1975: won for L'important c'est d'aimer
1976: nominated for Une femme à sa fenêtre
1978: won for Une histoire simple
1979: nominated for Clair de femme
1982: nominated for La Passante du Sans-Souci
Deutscher Filmpreis Best Actress: 1977 for Group Portrait with a Lady
Premio David di Donatello: 1979 Lifetime Achievement
2008: Honorary César

Awards named after Romy Schneider
Prix Romy Schneider, French film award established in 1984
Romy, Austrian award established in 1990

References

Further reading 
 
  (2009) Romy Schneider (in German). Rowohlt Verlag.

External links

 
Romy Schneider at the German Dubbing Card Index

 
1938 births
1982 deaths
20th-century French actresses
20th-century German actresses
Best Actress César Award winners
Best Actress German Film Award winners
César Honorary Award recipients
French film actresses
French stage actresses
German film actresses
German people of Austrian descent
Actresses from Vienna
French people of Austrian descent
French people of German descent
German emigrants to France